Cannabicyclol (CBL) is a non-psychoactive cannabinoid found in Cannabis. CBL is a degradative product like cannabinol, with cannabichromene degrading into CBL through natural irradiation or under acid conditions.

CBL is not scheduled under the Convention on Psychotropic Substances.

See also 
 Cannabis
 Medical cannabis

References

External links 
 CTD's Cannabicyclol page from the Comparative Toxicogenomics Database
 Wiley-VCH list of chemicals 

Phytocannabinoids
Phenols
Benzopyrans
Cyclobutanes
Cyclopentanes
Heterocyclic compounds with 4 rings